Tom Fields (born 19 December 1992) is a former professional Australian rules footballer who played for the Carlton Football Club in the Australian Football League (AFL).

Fields was raised in Queensland. He played football for North East Australian Football League club Labrador, and he represented Queensland at the 2011 AFL Under 18 Championships. After the 2012 season, Fields moved to Adelaide and played in the South Australian National Football League for South Adelaide as a tall attacking defender, where he played for two seasons.

He played much of the 2015 season with Carlton's , the Northern Blues, before making his senior AFL debut in round 15, 2015. He was delisted in October 2015.

Fields became noted during his time in the SANFL for his ability to kick long torpedo punts, and prior to being drafted by Carlton he had considered his options of studying and playing American football as a punter at an American college.

References

External links

1992 births
Living people
Carlton Football Club players
South Adelaide Football Club players
Preston Football Club (VFA) players
Labrador Australian Football Club players
Southport Australian Football Club players
Australian rules footballers from Queensland